La Rocchetta Lighthouse is an active lighthouse located on the southern part of the promontory of Piombino overlooking the Piombino Channel which separates the Elba from the mainland.

Description
The lighthouse was built in 1928 on the same place where once was La Rocchetta, one of the four defensive fortifications, then demolished in the 1920s in order to make room for a panoramic town square above the cliff, which were connected to each other by walls that surrounded the city.

The lighthouse is completely automated and managed by the Marina Militare with the identification code number 2098 E.F.

See also
 List of lighthouses in Italy

References

External links

 Servizio Fari Marina Militare

Lighthouses in Tuscany
Buildings and structures in Piombino
Lighthouses in Italy